The Swiss International Championships also called the International Swiss Championships or Championship of Switzerland or simply Swiss Championships was a combined men's and women's clay court tennis tournament established by the Swiss Lawn Tennis Association, and first played at Grasshopper Club, Zurich, Switzerland in 1897. The championships were then held annually and alternated between different venues until 1967. In 1968 the tournament was renamed the Swiss Open International Championships or simply Swiss Open Championships and were then staged permanently at Gstaad. From 1977 the women's tournament was staged at Lausanne and was called the WTA Swiss Open, today that event is branded as the Ladies Open Lausanne.

History
The first early edition of the Championship of Switzerland, was played at the Grasshopper Club, Zurich, Switzerland under the auspices of the Swiss Lawn Tennis Association, the winner of the men's event was presented with a cup valued at 500 francs. In 1898 the Swiss Lawn Tennis Association staged the event at Château d’Oex. In 1899 an open women's singles event was added to the schedule, when the venue was still in Saint Moritz. In 1968 the tournament continued into the open branded as the Swiss Open Championships and held permanently at Gstaad the men's event is still active today known as the Swiss Open. The women's event in 1968 was held at Lugano. In 1969 the women's then returned to Gstaad. In 1977 the women's tournament was rebranded as the WTA Swiss Open until 1981 when that event was moved to Lugano. The women's event today is known as the Ladies Open Lausanne held at Lausanne, Switzerland.

Former notable winners of men's singles include; André Vacherot (1903), George Simond (1905), R. Norris Williams (1911), Gottfried von Cramm (1934–1935), Kho Sin-Kie (1938), Jaroslav Drobný (1946), Roy Emerson (1959–1961, 1966–1967), Rod Laver (1962), Nicola Pietrangeli (1963) and Rafael Osuna (1964).

In the women's singles event notable winners include; Charlotte Cooper Sterry (1902), Adine Masson (1904), Elsie Lane (1907),  Germaine Régnier Golding (1921–1922, 1924), Lolette Payot (1931, 1933–1934), Louis Brough (1950), Christine Truman (1959), Maria Bueno (1960) and Margaret Smith (1962, 1964).

Host locations
The Swiss International Championships were staged at the following locations throughout its run including Basel, Champéry, Geneva, Gstaad, Les Avants, Montreux, Lausanne, Lugano, Lucerne, Ragatz, St. Moritz, Zermatt, and Zurich from 1897 to 1967.

Finals

Men's Singles
Incomplete roll

Women's singles
Incomplete roll

References

Sources
 Condon, Robert J. (1990). The Fifty Finest Athletes of the 20th Century: A Worldwide Reference. Jefferson, North Carolina, USA,: McFarland & Company. ISBN 978-0-89950-374-5.
 Nieuwland, Alex. "Tournament – Swiss International Championships. Netherlands: Tennis Archives.
 Paret, Jahial Parmly; Maddren, William Harvey (1904). Lawn tennis, its past, present, and future. New York, London: Macmillan. 
 Player Profile: Hyotare Sato". ATP Tour. ATP. 
 Player Profile: Robert Hough". ATP Tour. ATP. 
 Player Profile; Yoshiro Ota". International Tennis Federation.
 Sports Illustrated (1957) New York. United States.
 The Outing Magazine. (1899) Boston, United States: Outing Publishing Company.
 Times, The New York (24 July 1967). The New York Times. The New York Times Company.
 Wechsler, Bob (2008). Day by Day in Jewish Sports History. New York: KTAV Publishing House, Inc. ISBN 978-1-60280-013-7.
 Writers, Staff. "1877 to 2012 Finals Results". Steve G Tennis. stevegtennis.com.

Clay court tennis tournaments
Tennis tournaments in Switzerland